Shankar Oram (born on 31 August 1969) is an Indian politician. He was elected to the Odisha Legislative Assembly from Biramitrapur in the 2019 Odisha Legislative Assembly election as a member of the Bharatiya Janata Party.

References

1969 births
Living people
People from Sundergarh district
Bharatiya Janata Party politicians from Odisha
Odisha MLAs 2019–2024